The Michael Tuck Medal was awarded to the best-and-fairest player in the AFL Pre-season Cup Final. The award was presented annually between 1992 and 2013; since 2014, the award has not been presented due to the preseason being structured without a final.

Recipients

Italics - denotes winner from losing team of that Grand Final.

Trivia
Adelaide's Simon Goodwin is the only player to win the medal despite playing in the losing side when they were defeated by Geelong in 2006.
Nick Stevens is the only player to win two Michael Tuck medals.
Tuck committed an amusing faux pas in 2005, when he himself accidentally referred to the medal as the Norm Smith Medal while presenting it (the Norm Smith Medal is awarded to the best-and-fairest player in the premiership season grand final). He has alluded to this mistake prior to awarding the medal in future seasons by emphasising his name; in 2009 his words were "my name is Michael Tuck, and the winner of the Michael Tuck Medal is Joel Selwood."

References

Australian Football League awards
Awards established in 1992
1992 establishments in Australia
Australian rules football-related lists